Ali Ceylan (born 17 June 1998) is a German footballer who plays as a left winger for Turkish club Fethiyespor.

Career

Club career
Ceylan started playing football at SV Bergisch Gladbach 09 before moving to FC Viktoria Köln in his hometown. He played there until 2015 in the youth classes up to the U19, before moving to the U19 of FC Rot-Weiß Erfurt in January 2016.

After only half a year he went back to Cologne to the U19 of SC Fortuna Köln. In summer 2017 he received his first professional contract from the club, after he had ascended to the Bundesliga with the clubs A-Juniors. He made his professional debut in the 3. Liga with a substitution on match day 2 of the 2017/18 season against FC Carl Zeiss Jena.

In January 2029, Ceylan moved to league competitor Wuppertaler SV. On 17 July 2020, he signed with TuS Rot-Weiß Koblenz.

References

1998 births
Footballers from Cologne
German people of Turkish descent
Living people
German footballers
Association football wingers
SV Bergisch Gladbach 09 players
FC Viktoria Köln players
FC Rot-Weiß Erfurt players
SC Fortuna Köln players
Wuppertaler SV players
FC Rot-Weiß Koblenz players
Fethiyespor footballers
3. Liga players
Regionalliga players
German expatriate footballers
Expatriate footballers in Turkey
German expatriate sportspeople in Turkey